Aníbal Villacís (1927, Ambato, Ecuador – March 7, 2012) was a master painter from Ecuador who used raw earthen materials such as clay and natural pigments to paint on walls and doors throughout his city when he could not afford expensive artist materials.  As a teenager, Villacís taught himself drawing and composition by studying and recreating the illustrated ad posters for bullfights in Quito. In 1952, Jose Maria Velasco Ibarra, former President of Ecuador, discovered Villacís and offered him a scholarship to study in Paris.

After living in Paris for almost a year, Villacís never grew accustomed to the language, so he wrote to the Ecuadorian Minister of Education requesting to transfer his studies to Madrid.  Villacís felt more comfortable in Spain and lived there for six years.  While living in Madrid, Villacís was introduced to the Informalismo or Informalist Movement, specifically, Antoni Tàpies, Antonio Saura, and Modest Cuixart, who quickly began to influence his work.  Villacís was a co-founder of the VAN Group (Vanguardia Artística Nacional), the Informalist artist collective that embraced Informalism while searching for new modern aesthetics inspired by Pre-Columbian art (also referred to as Ancestralism or The Ancestralists).  Other members of VAN included, Enrique Tábara, Estuardo Maldonado, Luis Molinari, Hugo Cifuentes, León Ricaurte and Gilberto Almeida.

Villacís is mostly well known for his series called,  Filigranas (Filigree), which he started in the late fifties. The Filigranas series were typically mixed media on masonite, wood or canvas with the addition of any combination of the following applied:  marble dust, sand, metal, plaster, paint, gold and/or silver leaf or powder to create new modern aesthetics influenced by his Pre-Columbian ancestors.  In Villacís' works made of wood he will laboriously carve into the wood to define Pre-Columbian inspired shapes and abstract symbols.  Villacís will often layer many different colors of paint and then scrape some away to reveal the different colors of the layers below, giving the impression of an ancient sacred relic that has aged with time. The addition of silver and gold in Villacís' work is reminiscent of the art of the Baroque period, where the addition of these metals was often used to create a divine or sacred experience.

Villacis' passion for the art and culture of the Pre-Columbian period is obvious in his work.  He feels it is the beginning of life in his continent. In Pre-Columbian art there is evidence, through images and forms, of a remote life; an insight into total wisdom and enchantment. A life colored with rituals, habits and incarnated customs, signs and symbols, magic and religion through the myth. The images are constituted by the emotional, sensible perception of vitality; and the forms represent an order of the imagination and thought, governed by a rigorous construction that was built by the creative men of prehistoric times.

In the seventies, Villacís began painting faces of Quito's ghetto children to highlight their "insecurities, uncertainty, and premature old age".  Villacís has also been known to paint landscapes, cityscapes and bullfighting scenes. Villacís has always been intrigued by bullfighting, regularly attending bullfights in both Spain and Ecuador.

Internationally, Villacís has exhibited his work throughout the corners of Latin America: Ecuador, Venezuela, Colombia, Peru, Argentina, Dominican Republic, Brazil, El Salvador, as well as the United States and Europe.

In 2007, Villacís was awarded Ecuador's most prestigious honor in Art, Literature and Culture, Premio Eugenio Espejo, the National Award presented by the president of Ecuador.

Villacís died on March 7, 2012, at the age of 85.

Selected exhibitions and collections 
 1950 – Venezuela Club
 1951 – Caracas Athenaeum, Caracas, Venezuela
 1952 – House of Culture, Ambato, Ecuador
 1953 – Hispanic Culture Institute, Madrid, Spain
 1954 – Minerva Hall, “Circulo de BB.AA.”, Madrid, Spain
 1956 – Colonial Art Museum, Quito, Ecuador
 1956 – National Museum, Bogota, Colombia
 1956 – Colombian/Ecuadorian Institute, Bogota, Colombia
 1957 – “Salon Fiesta de la Fruta”, Ambato, Ecuador
 1957 – L’ Hermitage Hall, Ambato, Ecuador
 1957 – Colonial Art Museum, Quito, Ecuador
 1957 – Mariano Aguilera Hall, Quito, Ecuador
 1958 – American/Ecuadorian Center, Ambato, Ecuador
 1958 – Colonial Art Museum, Quito, Ecuador
 1958 – “Young Paintings from Ecuador”, Río de Janeiro, Brazil
 1959 – “South American Art Today”, Dallas Museum of Art, Dallas, Texas, U.S.
 1960 – Mariano Aguilera Hall, Quito, Ecuador
 1962 – “Asociación de Artistas Plásticos” Hall, Quito, Ecuador
 1962 – Pan American Union, Washington D.C., U.S.
 1963 – Art from America and Spain, Madrid, Spain
 1964 – II Biennial of Cordoba, Cordoba, Argentina
 1965 – Mariano Aguilera Hall, Quito, Ecuador
 1966 – Bolivarian Hall, Cali, Colombia
 1966 – National School of Bolivar, Ambato, Ecuador
 1966 – Biennial of Venecia, Venice, Italy
 1968 – I Biennial Iberic-American of painting, Colterjer, Medellin, Colombia
 1969 – X Biennial de São Paulo, São Paulo, Brazil
 1969 – Luis A. Martinez Hall, Ambato, Ecuador
 1970 – Contemporary Andean Area painting exhibition, Lima, Peru
 1970 – II Biennial Iberic-American of painting, Colterjer,[Medellin, Colombia
 1970 – Plastic Actualization, CCE, Quito, Ecuador
 1970 – XII October may, Guayaquil, Ecuador
 1970 – Fruits and Flowers Party, Ambato, Ecuador
 1971 – Altamira Gallery, Quito, Ecuador
 1972 – University Art Museum, University of Texas at Austin, Austin, Texas, U.S.
 1972 – III Biennial Ibero-American of painting, Coltejer, Medellin, Colombia
 1972 – Latin-American Painting Hall, Quito, Ecuador
 1973 – XII Biennial de São Paulo, São Paulo, Brazil
 1973 – Represents Ecuador in the International Exposition “Picasso Homage”, Washington D.C., U.S.
 1974 – “Pinacoteca” of the National Museum, Guayaquil, Ecuador]
 1975 – Goribar Gallery, Quito, Ecuador
 1976 – National Plastic Arts Hall, Quito, Ecuador
 1977 – Abstract Currents in Ecuadorian Art: Paintings by: Gilbert, Rendon, Tábara, Villacís, Molinari and Maldonado. Center for Inter-American Relations, New York, New York, U.S.
 1977 – “Latino American Painting Homage” exhibition, San Salvador, El Salvador
 1977 – “Latin-American Painters” exhibition, Santo Domingo, Dominican Republic
 1977 – Exhibition on Gallery 9,Lima, Peru
 1978 – I Biennial Latin Americana de São Paulo, São Paulo, Brazil
 1979 – “Forma” Gallery, Coral Gables, Florida, U.S.
 1980 – Art Club Gallery, Quito, Ecuador
 1980 – “Hug e Colombo”, Ascona, Switzerland
 1981 – Lincoln Auditory, Quito, Ecuador
 1983 – De Armas Gallery, Miami, Florida, U.S.
 1984 – Contemporary Art Hall, Quito, Ecuador
 1986 – Participation in the Bolivarian Museum, Quinta San Pedro Alejandrino, Colombia
 1986 – Contemporary Art Hall, Quito, Ecuador
 1987 – Plastic Homage for Guayaquil’s 450 Anniversary, Guayaquil, Ecuador
 1988 – Ecuadorian Painting, Dallas, Texas, U.S.
 1991 – Exposition and Presentation of Serigraph Folder “Manzana Verde”, Quito, Ecuador
 1991 – “Posada de Artes Kingman” Gallery, Quito, Ecuador
 1992 – Jorge Sosa Art Gallery, Quito, Ecuador
 1994 – “Todo Arte” Gallery, Guayaquil, Ecuador
 1994 – “Larrazabal” Gallery, Cuenca, Ecuador
 1994 – “Filanbanco” Museum, Quito, Ecuador
 1996 – Great Painters of the Ecuadorian Plastic, Ambato, Ecuador
 1996 – Exhibition Fair, Buenos Aires, Argentina
 2004 – I National Fair of Plastic Arts, River Basin, Ecuador
 2004 – Encuentro Tres Generaciones, Paintings by Villacís, his son and his granddaughter, Casa de la Cultura Ecuatoriana, Guayaquil, Ecuador
 2004 – III Biennial of Inter-American Painting, Colombia
 2004 – Retrospectiva Mes de las Arte, Buenos Aires, Argentina
 2005 – The Ancestralismo, Villacís, Tábara, Viteri and Maldonado, Museum of the Central Bank, River Basin, Ecuador
 2005 – Pinturas de Villacís, Galeria Todo Arte, Guayaquil, Ecuador
 2006 – Centro Cultural Metropolitano de Quito, Quito, Ecuador
 2006 – Quito: The City, The Paintings, Itchimbía Cultural Center, Quito, Ecuador
 2008 – Ministry of Foreign Trade and Integration – Ecuadorian Embassy in Germany, Berlin, Germany
 2009 – Latin American Art: Glimpses from the 1960s and 1970s, Museum of Fine Arts, St. Petersburg, Florida, U.S.
 2010 – Elogio de la Forma, Moderno del Museo Municipal de Guayaquil, Guayaquil, Ecuador
 2011 – Símbolos y Signos de Nuestra Sangre, Museo de Arte Colonial, Quito, Ecuador
 2012 – Símbolos y Signos, Las Huellas Recogidas, Casa de la Cultura Ecuatoriana – Núcleo del Guayas, Guayaquil, Ecuador
 2012 – Geografías Plásticas del arte Ecuatoriano del Siglo XX: Desde la Estética del Objeto al Concepto, Museo Antropológico y de Arte Contemporáneo (MAAC), Guayaquil, Ecuador
 Permanent Collection – Casa de la Cultura, Guayaquil, Ecuador
 Permanent Collection – Museo de Arte Colonial, Quito, Ecuador
 Permanent Collection – San Diego Museum of Art, San Diego, California, U.S.
 Permanent Collection – Blanton Museum of Art, The University of Texas at Austin, Austin, Texas, U.S.
 Permanent Collection – Museo Antropologico y de Arte Contemporaneo (MAAC), Guayaquil, Ecuador
 Permanent Collection – National Museum of the Central Bank of Ecuador, Quito, Ecuador
 Permanent Collection – Art Museum of the Americas, Organization of American States (OAS), Washington, D.C., U.S.
 Permanent Collection – Pat Clark Gallery, Ellsworth College, Iowa Falls, Iowa, U.S.
 Permanent Collection – Embassy of Panama, Washington, D. C., U.S.

Awards and distinctions 

 1952 – Velasco Ibarra’s Government Scholarship to study in Europe
 1953 – Scholarship from Hispanic Cultural Institute of Madrid, Madrid, Spain
 1956 – Prize Acquisition Museum of Colonial Art, Quito, Ecuador
 1957 – Second “Acquisition Award”, Mariano Aguilera Hall, Quito, Ecuador
 1959 – Acquisition Award, South America Art of Today, Dallas Museum of Art, Dallas, Texas, U.S.
 1959 – Third Prize “Guayaquil Foundation Hall”, Guayaquil, Ecuador	
 1960 – First Prize Mariano Aguilera in Quito, Ecuador
 1960 – Second Prize Acquisition of the XI Hall, Guayaquil, Ecuador
 1963 – Special Recognition, Mariano Aguilera Hall, Quito, Ecuador
 1964 – Second Prize II Biennial of Cordoba, Cordoba, Argentina
 1965 – First Prize Mariano Aguilera for the work, Incaico, Quito, Ecuador
 1966 – Second Prize, Salón Bolivariano de Cali, Cali, Colombia
 1969 – First Prize, Salón de la Casa de la Cultura de Guayaquil, for the work, Calendario Precolombino, Guayaquil, Ecuador
 1970 – First Prize in XIII Salón de Octubre de Guayaquil, Guayaquil, Ecuador
 1972 – First Prize, Latin-American Painting Hall, Quito, Ecuador
 1972 – Second Prize, National Plastic Arts Hall, Quito, Ecuador
 1978 – Decoration of Artistic Merit in the Order of Commander, Ecuador
 1980 – Artistic Merit Honor, Jaime Roldos Presidency
 2005 – First National Prize, Eugenio Espejo
 2005 – Recognition Tribute, Regional Direction of Culture Central Bank Guayaquil-Ecuador
 2007 – National Prize of Culture, Premio Eugenio Espejo, presented by the president of Ecuador, Rafael Correa
 2011 – Exhibit Hall named in honor of the artist in the Museo de Arte Colonial, Quito, Ecuador

References
 [1] https://web.archive.org/web/20120809140902/http://www.embassyofpanama.org/cms/artworks3.php
 https://web.archive.org/web/20140201170756/http://www.dm-art.org/art/exhibition-archive/south-american-art-today
 Sullivan, Edward J.,  Latin American Art in the Twentieth-Century. Phaidon Press Limited; London, 1996.
 Barnitz, Jacqueline, Twentieth-Century Art of Latin America.  University of Texas Press; Austin, TX, 2001.
 Salvat, Arte Contemporáneo de Ecuador. Salvat Editores Ecuatoriana, S.A., Quito, Ecuador, 1977.
 Latin American Research Review, Vol. 7, No. 2 (Summer, 1972), pp. 180–182.
 Municipalidad de Guayaquil – www.guayaquil.gov.ec/data/salondejulio/antecedentes.htm

1927 births
2012 deaths
People from Ambato, Ecuador
Ecuadorian painters
Modern artists
Contemporary painters
Ecuadorian expatriates in France
Ecuadorian expatriates in Spain